Quvasoy is a city in Fergana Region in eastern Uzbekistan. Administratively, Quvasoy is a district-level city, that includes the urban-type settlement Doʻstlik and 6 rural communities. The population of Quvasoy is 96,900 (2022). It lies along the river Isfayramsay, close to the border with Kyrgyzstan.

References

Populated places in Fergana Region
Cities in Uzbekistan